Bertorelli is a surname. Notable people with the surname include:

Giovanni Bertorelli (1928–2006), Venezuelan fencer
Toni Bertorelli (1948–2017), Italian actor

See also
Bertarelli
Paramount Restaurants

Italian-language surnames